The 1957 Rose Bowl was the 43rd edition of the college football bowl game, played at the Rose Bowl in Pasadena, California, on Tuesday, January 1. The third-ranked Iowa Hawkeyes of the Big Ten Conference defeated the #10 Oregon State Beavers of the Pacific Coast Conference by a score of 35–19, in a rematch of a regular season contest in early October at Iowa City, where the home team rallied to win, 14–13.

Iowa quarterback Ken Ploen was named the  Player of the Game.

This was the first trip to Pasadena for both teams: it was Iowa's first bowl appearance and Oregon State's second. The Beavers won the Rose Bowl fifteen years earlier in January 1942, which was moved to Durham, North Carolina.

Game summary
Ploen completed nine of ten passes and rushed for 59 yards, including a 49-yard run for Iowa's first score. Collins Hagler scored twice for the Hawkeyes, the second on a 66-yard run. For Oregon State, Joe Francis ran for 73 yards and was ten of twelve passing for 73 yards and a touchdown. The Beavers were hurt by three fumbles, two in the first seven minutes, and both led to Iowa touchdowns. The Hawkeyes led 21–6 at halftime and were up by 23 points early in the fourth quarter. OSC closed the margin to sixteen points with under ten minutes remaining, but that was the last of the scoring and Iowa won 35–19.

Scoring

First quarter
 Iowa – Ken Ploen 49-yard run (Bob Prescott kick), 10:44 remaining, (Iowa 7–0)
 Iowa – Collins Hagler 9-yard run (Prescott kick), 7:20, (Iowa, 14–0)

Second quarter
 OSC – Tom Berry 3-yard run (kick blocked), 14:48, (Iowa, 14–6)
 Iowa – Bill Happel 5-yard run (Prescott kick), 3:23, (Iowa, 21–6)

Third quarter
 Iowa – Collins Hagler 66-yard run (Prescott kick), 12:29, (Iowa, 28–6)
 OSC – Nub Beamer 1-yard run (kick blocked), 5:20, (Iowa, 28–12)

Fourth quarter
 Iowa – Jim Gibbons 16-yard pass from Ken Ploen (Prescott kick), 14:47, (Iowa 35–12)
 OSC – Sterling Hammack 35-yard pass from Joe Francis (Beamer run), 9:41, (Iowa 35–19)

References

Rose Bowl
Rose Bowl Game
Iowa Hawkeyes football bowl games
Oregon State Beavers football bowl games
1957 in sports in California
January 1957 sports events in the United States